"Feel Your Love" is a pop-dance and new jack swing song co-written by Alanis Morissette and Leslie Howe, and produced by Howe for Morissette's debut album, Alanis (1991). Its protagonist tells a boy she has "got this thing" for him, and that "it's drivin' me right out of my mind ... I wanna feel your love; you know this waitin' for you boy I can't stand". Morissette's brothers Chad and Wade provided some of the song's backing vocals. It was released as the album's third single in 1991 (see 1991 in music) and was the second commercial single release after "Too Hot". The single charted at number 24 in Canada.

"Feel Your Love", along with "Too Hot" and "An Emotion Away" (from Morissette's 1992 second album Now Is the Time), was used on the soundtrack of the 1993 film Just One of the Girls, in which Morissette appeared.

Music video
The single's video, like the videos for the album's previous singles, features Morissette dancing; she also attempts to seduce a man in the video.

Track listing
CD Promo
"Feel Your Love" (Bad Dawg Remix)
"Feel Your Love" (Album Version)
"Feel Your Love" (Big Bad Dawg Remix)
"Feel Your Love" (Muzzle Mix)

Personnel
 Produced, engineered and mixed by Leslie Howe for Ghetto Records
 Keyboards by Serge Côté
 Drum programming, guitar and additional keyboards by Leslie "Bud" Howe
 All vocals by Alanis Morissette
 Back-up vocals by Chad & Wade Morissette, Tyley Ross, John & Peter (The "Burn Bros."), Tom "Sloppy" Saidak, Kevin "Iceman" Little, Dan "Capt. Pin", Deane Josh Lovejoy, Sean Daley, Jenny "Frank #1" Parlier, Mr. Fish, Sal, Rick "Slick" Kumar.
 Recorded at Distortion Studios in Ottawa, Ontario, Canada

References
 "Alanis Morissette Discography - Feel Your Love". GeoCities: alanisdisco. Retrieved August 20, 2006.
"Early Releases". Vip portal. Retrieved August 20, 2006.
Unknown (1991). In Alanis [CD liner notes]. Canada: MCA Records.

1991 singles
Alanis Morissette songs
Songs written by Alanis Morissette
Songs written by Leslie Howe
1990 songs
MCA Records singles
New jack swing songs